Outrageous Fortune is a 1987 American comedy film written by Leslie Dixon, directed by Arthur Hiller and starring Shelley Long and Bette Midler. The title is taken from Shakespeare's Hamlet ("...the slings and arrows of outrageous fortune..."). It is the tenth film of Touchstone Pictures.

The film was successful at the box office, and Midler was nominated for the Golden Globe Award for Best Actress – Motion Picture Musical or Comedy, and won an American Comedy Award for  Funniest Actress in a Motion Picture (Leading Role).

Plot
Refined but struggling actress Lauren Ames (Shelley Long) finally has a chance to study with the great theatre professor Stanislav Korzenowski (Robert Prosky). Sandy Brozinsky (Bette Midler), a brash, loud actress, decides through happenstance to also study with Korzenowski. Lauren and Sandy take an instant dislike to each other when they first meet in Korzenowski's class, but unknown to each other, both women begin dating the same man, Michael Santers (Peter Coyote).

When Michael "dies" in a gas explosion at a local store, Lauren and Sandy figure out that Michael may have faked his death, and they form an uneasy alliance to follow leads across the country to find him and force him to choose between them. During their quest, Lauren and Sandy are chased by CIA agents, as well as Russian assassins who are also after Michael.

When Lauren and Sandy finally find Michael, he tries to kill both of them and they are forced to run until they are captured by the federal agents. Lauren and Sandy learn that Michael is a double agent for the CIA who has now gone rogue, also working for the KGB, and that he has stolen a toxin that could destroy huge areas of nature with just a few drops. The CIA wants to find Michael to force him to give back the toxin bio-weapon, while the Russian assassins are men cheated by the double agent who works for Korzenowski, their theatre professor.

The chase leads to rural New Mexico when Lauren is taken hostage by Michael and his rogue associates who force a trade with the CIA for the toxin, and with Korzenowski with the stolen cash he intended to give to Michael. When the trade goes awry, Lauren gets away with both the money and the toxin, with Michael in hot pursuit. Cornered on a series of mountain tops, Lauren uses her former ballet skills to evade him, culminating in a  grand jeté, as pursuing Michael slips and is presumably killed on the rocks far below while the money is lost to Native Americans. The women form a lasting friendship, and go on to perform Hamlet together, with Lauren in the title role and Sandy as Ophelia.

Cast
 Shelley Long as Lauren Ames
 Bette Midler as Sandy Brozinsky
 Peter Coyote as Michael Santers
 Robert Prosky as Stanislav Korzenowski
 George Carlin as Frank Madras
 John Schuck as Agent Atkins
 Anthony Heald as Agent Weldon
 Christopher McDonald as George

Both Shelley Long and Bette Midler were promised top billing when they signed to do the film; however, neither was willing to give up top billing to the other. To compromise, Long received top billing in advertising west of the Mississippi River, and Midler received the honor in the east. This agreement extended through the original LaserDisc and VHS release of the title, with discs shipped to retailers in the west featuring Shelley Long and retailers on the east receiving discs featuring Bette Midler.

On an episode of Oprah, Midler remarked that working with Long was "rough," echoing similar sentiments amongst Long's bosses on her hit TV series Cheers. 

Suzanne Somers has said that Michael Eisner offered her a three-movie deal with Disney which included Outrageous Fortune, but she turned it down. She would have played Bette Midler's part.

Reception
The film received mixed reviews from critics. It currently holds a 56% rating on review aggregator Rotten Tomatoes, based on 25 reviews, indicating a lukewarm response. For her performance, Midler received a Golden Globe nomination.

Box office
Outrageous Fortune was financially successful, debuting at number 2 at the US box office with a gross of $6.4 million in its opening weekend, a record for Disney at the time. It went on to gross $52.9 million in the US and Canada.

References

External links

 
 
 
 
 
 
Outrageous Fortune at The 80s Movie Rewind

1987 films
1980s English-language films
1980s buddy comedy films
1980s female buddy films
1980s comedy mystery films
Films directed by Arthur Hiller
Touchstone Pictures films
American female buddy films
Films set in New Mexico
Films set in New York City
Films shot in New Mexico
American comedy road movies
1980s comedy road movies
American action comedy films
Interscope Communications films
Films scored by Alan Silvestri
Films with screenplays by Leslie Dixon
1987 comedy films
1980s American films